Chawleigh is a village and civil parish in Mid Devon in the English county of Devon, situated just off the A377 between Crediton and Barnstaple.  It has a population of 621, increasing to 867 at the 2011 Census.

References

External links

Villages in Devon